Venus and Cupid with a Satyr (c. 1528) is a painting by the Italian High Renaissance artist Antonio da Correggio. It is now in the Musée du Louvre in Paris.

Background 
This painting  was in the 16th century in the private collection of count Nicholas Maffei. It is very likely that one of the members of the Maffei family has commissioned two paintings that they then arrived in the 17th century in the collection of the Gonzaga family, with whom the Maffei were relatives. In fact, the son of count Nicholas Maffei, count Frederick Maffei, married Isabel, daughter of Cardinal Ercole Gonzaga.

Description 
The work depicts Venus sleeping with her son Eros. Behind them, a satyr is caught while discovering the goddess. The picture is often also seen as portraying Jupiter and Antiope as, according to mythology and Ovid, Jupiter had turned himself into a satyr to rape the nymph.

The painting was probably connected to Correggio's Venus with Mercury and Cupid (The School of Love), now in the National Gallery of London. It, or a copy of it, can be seen in the 1628 painting of the gallery of Cornelis van der Geest, by Willem van Haecht.

References

Further reading

External links 
 

Mythological paintings by Correggio
1528 paintings
Paintings in the Louvre by Italian artists
Paintings of Venus
Nude art
Paintings of Cupid
Gonzaga art collection